Several ships have been named Clan Forbes after the Highland Scottish clan.

  was a Clan Line cargo ship built by Alexander Stephen and Sons in Glasgow. She was sold to Furness, Withy & Co in 1903 and renamed London City, then scrapped in 1922.
  was built for Clan Line by William Doxford & Sons at Pallion, Sunderland and sunk by a u-boat in 1918.
 Clan Forbes (1903), a steam fishing trawler, was built by Smith's Dock Company at South Shields, Tyne and Wear, for Aberdeen owners. After sale to Dutch owners she was wrecked as Gerard on 31 October 1915.
  was a Clan Line cargo liner in their Cameron-class. She survived World War II service and was scrapped in 1959.
  (1961) was a cargo liner, built by Swan, Hunter & Wigham Richardson at Wallsend, Tyne and Wear for Clan Line. She was sold in 1968 Arya National Shipping Company, Iran, and scrapped in 1985.

See also
 List of ships named Forbes

References

clan Forbes